Francesco Belli (born 13 March 1994) is an Italian professional footballer who plays as a defender for  club Padova.

Club career
On 8 July 2019, he signed with Pisa.

On 21 July 2021 was signed by Bari.

On 2 August 2022, Belli signed a two-year contract with Padova.

International career
Belli played a match for Italy U20 against Switzerland on Under-20 Four Nations Tournament 2014–15.

Honours
Bari
 Serie C: 2021–22 (Group C)

References

External links
 

1994 births
Living people
Footballers from Florence
Italian footballers
Association football defenders
Serie B players
Serie C players
Serie D players
U.S. Pistoiese 1921 players
Virtus Entella players
Pisa S.C. players
S.S.C. Bari players
Calcio Padova players
Italy youth international footballers